In combinatorics, an abstract simplicial complex (ASC), often called an abstract complex or just a complex, is a family of sets that is closed under taking subsets, i.e., every subset of a set in the family is also in the family. It is a purely combinatorial description of the geometric notion of a simplicial complex. For example, in a 2-dimensional simplicial complex, the sets in the family are the triangles (sets of size 3), their edges (sets of size 2), and their vertices (sets of size 1).

In the context of matroids and greedoids, abstract simplicial complexes are also called independence systems.

An abstract simplex can be studied algebraically by forming its Stanley–Reisner ring; this sets up a powerful relation between combinatorics and commutative algebra.

Definitions
A collection  of non-empty finite subsets of a set S is called a set-family.

The elements of the vertex set are called the vertices of the complex.

The dimension of the complex  is defined as the largest dimension of any of its faces, or infinity if there is no finite bound on the dimension of the faces.

The complex  is said to be finite if it has finitely many faces, or equivalently if its vertex set is finite. Also,  is said to be pure if it is finite-dimensional (but not necessarily finite) and every facet has the same dimension. In other words,  is pure if  is finite and every face is contained in a facet of dimension .

One-dimensional abstract simplicial complexes are mathematically equivalent to simple undirected graphs: the vertex set of the complex can be viewed as the vertex set of a graph, and the two-element facets of the complex correspond to undirected edges of a graph. In this view, one-element facets of a complex correspond to isolated vertices that do not have any incident edges.

(However, some authors use the term "simplex" for a face or, rather ambiguously, for both a face and the subcomplex associated with a face, by analogy with the non-abstract (geometric) simplicial complex terminology. To avoid ambiguity, we do not use in this article the term "simplex" for a face in the context of abstract complexes).

The 0-skeleton of  can be identified with its vertex set, although formally it is not quite the same thing (the vertex set is a single set of all of the vertices, while the 0-skeleton is a family of single-element sets).

Note that the link of the empty set is  itself.

Simplicial maps 

There is a category SCpx with abstract simplicial complexes as objects and simplicial maps as morphisms. This is equivalent to a suitable category defined using non-abstract simplicial complexes.

More precisely, SCpx is equivalent to the category where:

Geometric realization
We can associate to any abstract simplicial complex (ASC) K a topological space , called its geometric realization. There are several ways to define .

Geometric definition 
Every geometric simplicial complex (GSC) determines an ASC: the vertices of the ASC are the vertices of the GSC, and the faces of the ASC are the vertex-sets of the faces of the GSC. For example, consider a GSC with 4 vertices {1,2,3,4}, where the maximal faces are the triangle between {1,2,3} and the lines between {2,4} and {3,4}. Then, the corresponding ASC contains the sets {1,2,3}, {2,4}, {3,4}, and all their subsets. We say that the GSC is the geometric realization of the ASC.  

Every ASC has a geometric realization. This is easy to see for a finite ASC. Let . Construct the GSC  {conv(F): F is a face in K}. Clearly, the ASC associated with this GSC is identical to K, so we have indeed constructed a geometric realization of K. In fact, an ASC can be realized using much fewer dimensions.

Every two geometric realizations of the same ASC, even in Euclidean spaces of different dimensions, are homeomorphic. Therefore, given an ASC K, one can speak of the geometric realization of K.

Topological definition 
The construction goes as follows. First, define  as a subset of  consisting of functions  satisfying the two conditions:

Now give  the subspace topology.

Categorical definition 
For any face X in K of dimension n, let  be the standard n-simplex.

We can then define the geometric realization   as the colimit of the functor F. More specifically   is the quotient space of the disjoint union

by the equivalence relation that identifies a point  with its image under the map , for every inclusion .

Examples
1. Let V be a finite set of cardinality . The combinatorial n-simplex with vertex-set V is an ASC whose faces are all nonempty subsets of V (i.e., it is the power set of V). If   then this ASC is called the standard combinatorial n-simplex.

2. Let G be an undirected graph. The clique complex of G is an ASC whose faces are all cliques (complete subgraphs) of G. The independence complex of G is an ASC whose faces are all independent sets of G (it is the clique complex of the complement graph of G).  Clique complexes are the prototypical example of flag complexes. A flag complex is a complex K  with the property that every set of elements that pairwise belong to faces of K is itself a face of K.

3. Let H be a hypergraph. A matching in H is a set of edges of H, in which every two edges are disjoint. The matching complex of H is an ASC whose faces are all matchings in H. It is the independence complex of the line graph of H.

4. Let P be a partially ordered set (poset). The order complex of P is an ASC whose faces are all finite chains in P. Its homology groups and other topological invariants contain important information about the poset P.

5. Let M be a metric space and δ a real number. The Vietoris–Rips complex is an ASC whose faces are the finite subsets of M with diameter at most δ. It has applications in homology theory, hyperbolic groups, image processing, and mobile ad hoc networking. It is another example of a flag complex.

6. Let  be a square-free monomial ideal in a polynomial ring  (that is, an ideal generated by products of subsets of variables). Then the exponent vectors of those square-free monomials of  that are not in  determine an abstract simplicial complex via the map .

7. For any open covering C of a topological space, the nerve complex of C is an abstract simplicial complex containing the sub-families of C with a non-empty intersection.

Enumeration
The number of abstract simplicial complexes on up to n labeled elements (that is on a set S of size n) is one less than the nth Dedekind number.
1, 2, 5, 19, 167, 7580, 7828353, 2414682040997, 56130437228687557907787 . This corresponds to the number of non-empty antichains of subsets of an  set.

The number of abstract simplicial complexes whose vertices are exactly n labeled elements is given by the sequence "1, 2, 9, 114, 6894, 7785062, 2414627396434, 56130437209370320359966"  , starting at n = 1. This corresponds to the number of antichain covers of a labeled n-set; there is a clear bijection between antichain covers of an n-set and simplicial complexes on n elements described in terms of their maximal faces.

The number of abstract simplicial complexes on exactly n unlabeled elements is given by the sequence "1, 2, 5, 20, 180, 16143" , starting at n = 1.

Computational problems 

The simplicial complex recognition problem is: given a finite ASC, decide whether its geometric realization is homeomorphic to a given geometric object. This problem is undecidable for any d-dimensional manifolds for d ≥ 5.

Relation to other concepts 
An abstract simplicial complex with an additional property called the augmentation property or the exchange property yields a matroid. The following expression shows the relations between the terms:

HYPERGRAPHS = SET-FAMILIES    ⊃    INDEPENDENCE-SYSTEMS = ABSTRACT-SIMPLICIAL-COMPLEXES    ⊃    MATROIDS.

See also
 Kruskal–Katona theorem
 Simplicial set

References

Algebraic topology
Families of sets
Simplicial sets